Color64 is a computer BBS system for the Commodore 64 during the 1980s. It was written by Greg Pfountz. The I/O was all written in machine language.  It was also composed in modules, each written in BASIC. A side program was developed, ColorTerm, which allowed IBM PC compatibles to log into Color64 BBS with the full C64 character set.

References

Commodore 64 software
Bulletin board system software